Red Kiss is a 1985 French drama film directed by Véra Belmont. It was entered into the 36th Berlin International Film Festival, where Charlotte Valandrey won the Silver Bear for Best Actress.

Cast
 Charlotte Valandrey as Nadia
 Lambert Wilson as Stéphane
 Marthe Keller as Bronka
 Laurent Terzieff as Moishe
 Laurent Arnal as Roland
 Elsa Lunghini as Rosa
 Isabelle Nanty as Jeanine
 Audrey Lazzini as Henriette
 Yves Nadot as André
 Jodi Pavlis as Marion
 Lionel Rocheman as M. Victor
 Georges Staquet as The Inspector
 Riton Liebman as Joël

References

External links

1985 films
1980s French-language films
1985 drama films
Films directed by Véra Belmont
Films set in 1952
French drama films
1980s French films